Villa Torlonia is a name of several country retreats of the princely family of Torlonia on the outskirts of Rome and in Frascati (Lazio) including:
Villa Torlonia (Frascati)
Villa Torlonia, San Mauro Pascoli
in Rome:
Villa Albani-Torlonia with its entrance in the via Salaria, better known by its former name, the Villa Albani
Villa Torlonia (Rome)
another Villa Torlonia, Rome, in Porta Pia, also known as Villa Bracciano, now the place of the British Embassy.